Charles Brooke (1777–1852), was an English Jesuit.

Brooke was born at Exeter, 8 August 1777, received his education at the English academy at Liège and at Stonyhurst, where he entered the Society of Jesus, of which he became a professed father (1818). He was provincial of his order from 1826 to 1832, and subsequently was made superior of the seminary at Stonyhurst College. After filling the office of rector of the Lancashire district, he was sent with broken health to Exeter, in 1845, to gather materials for a continuation of the history of the English province from the year 1635, to which period Father Henry More's 'Historia Missionis Anglicanæ Societatis Jesu' extends. The documents and information he collected were afterwards of much service in the compilation of Brother Henry Foley's valuable 'Records of the English Province of the Society of Jesus,' 8 vols. Lond. 1870–83. Father Brooke died at Exeter on 6 October 1852.

References

1777 births
1852 deaths
Clergy from Exeter
19th-century English Jesuits